An emission intensity (also carbon intensity or C.I.) is the emission rate of a given pollutant relative to the intensity of a specific activity, or an industrial production process; for example grams of carbon dioxide released per megajoule of energy produced, or the ratio of greenhouse gas emissions produced to gross domestic product (GDP). Emission intensities are used to derive estimates of air pollutant or greenhouse gas emissions based on the amount of fuel combusted, the number of animals in animal husbandry, on industrial production levels, distances traveled or similar activity data. Emission intensities may also be used to compare the environmental impact of different fuels or activities. In some case the related terms emission factor and carbon intensity are used interchangeably. The jargon used can be different, for different fields/industrial sectors; normally the term "carbon" excludes other pollutants, such as particulate emissions. One commonly used figure is carbon intensity per kilowatt-hour (CIPK), which is used to compare emissions from different sources of electrical power.

Methodologies
Different methodologies can be used to assess the carbon intensity of a process. Among the most used methodologies there are:
 The whole life-cycle assessment (LCA): this includes not only the carbon emissions due to a specific process, but also those due to the production and end-of-life of materials, plants and machineries used for the considered process. This is a quite complex method, requiring a big set of variables.
 The well-to-wheels (WTW), commonly used in the Energy and Transport sectors: this is a simplified LCA considering the emissions of the process itself, the emissions due to the extraction and refining of the material (or fuel) used in the process (also "Upstream emissions"), but excluding the emissions due to the production and end-of-life of plants and machineries. This methodology is used, in the US, by the GREET model and in Europe in the JEC WTW.
 WTW-LCA hybrid methods, trying to fill in the gap between the WTW and LCA methods. In example, for an Electric Vehicle, an hybrid method considering also the GHG due to the manufacturing and the end of life of the battery gives GHG emissions 10–13% higher, compared to the WTW  
 Methods not considering LCA aspects but only the emissions occurring during a specific process; i.e. just the combustion of a fuel in a power plant, without considering the Upstream emissions.

Different calculation methods can lead to different results. The results can largely vary also for different geographic regions and timeframes (see, in example, how C.I. of electricity varies, for different European countries, and how varied in a few years: from 2009 to 2013 the C.I. of electricity in the European Union fell on average by 20%, So while comparing different values of Carbon Intensity it is important to correctly consider all the boundary conditions (or initial hypotheses) considered for the calculations. For example, Chinese oil fields emit between 1.5 and more than 40 g of CO2eq per MJ with about 90% of all fields emitting 1.5–13.5 g CO2eq. Such highly skewed carbon intensity patterns necessitate disaggregation of seemingly homogeneous emission activities and proper consideration of many factors for understanding.

Estimating emissions 

Emission factors assume a linear relation between the intensity of the activity and the emission resulting from this activity:

Emissionpollutant = Activity * Emission Factorpollutant

Intensities are also used in projecting possible future scenarios such as those used in the IPCC assessments, along with projected future changes in population, economic activity and energy technologies. The interrelations of these variables is treated under the so-called Kaya identity.

The level of uncertainty of the resulting estimates depends significantly on the source category and the pollutant. Some examples: 
Carbon dioxide (CO2) emissions from the combustion of fuel can be estimated with a high degree of certainty regardless of how the fuel is used as these emissions depend almost exclusively on the carbon content of the fuel, which is generally known with a high degree of precision. The same is true for sulphur dioxide (SO2), since sulphur contents of fuels are also generally well known. Both carbon and sulphur are almost completely oxidized during combustion and all carbon and sulphur atoms in the fuel will be present in the flue gases as CO2 and SO2 respectively.
In contrast, the levels of other air pollutants and non-CO2 greenhouse gas emissions from combustion depend on the precise technology applied when fuel is combusted. These emissions are basically caused by either incomplete combustion of a small fraction of the fuel (carbon monoxide, methane, non-methane volatile organic compounds) or by complicated chemical and physical processes during the combustion and in the smoke stack or tailpipe. Examples of these are particulates, NOx, a mixture of nitric oxide, NO, and nitrogen dioxide, NO2).
Nitrous oxide (N2O) emissions from agricultural soils are highly uncertain because they depend very much on both the exact conditions of the soil, the application of fertilizers and meteorological conditions.

Electric generation

A literature review of numerous total life cycle energy sources  emissions per unit of electricity generated, conducted by the Intergovernmental Panel on Climate Change in 2011, found that the  emission value, that fell within the 50th percentile of all total life cycle emissions studies were as follows.

Note: 3.6 MJ = megajoule(s) == 1 kW·h = kilowatt-hour(s), thus 1 g/MJ = 3.6 g/kW·h.

Carbon intensity of regions

The following tables show carbon intensity of GDP in market exchange rates (MER) and purchasing power parities (PPP). Units are metric tons of carbon dioxide per thousand year 2005 US dollars. Data are taken from the US Energy Information Administration. Annual data between 1980 and 2009 are averaged over three decades: 1980–89, 1990–99, and 2000–09.

In 2009 CO2 intensity of GDP in the OECD countries reduced by 2.9%  and amounted to 0.33 kCO2/$05p in the OECD countries. ("$05p" = 2005 US dollars, using purchasing power parities). The USA posted a higher ratio of 0.41 kCO2/$05p while Europe showed the largest drop in CO2 intensity compared to the previous year (−3.7%). CO2 intensity continued to be roughly higher in non-OECD countries. Despite a slight improvement, China continued to post a high CO2 intensity (0.81 kCO2/$05p). CO2 intensity in Asia rose by 2% during 2009 since energy consumption continued to develop at a strong pace. Important ratios were also observed in countries in CIS and the Middle East.

Carbon intensity in Europe 

Total CO2 emissions from energy use were 5% below their 1990 level in 2007. Over the period 1990–2007, CO2 emissions from energy use have decreased on average by 0.3%/year although the economic activity (GDP) increased by 2.3%/year. After dropping until 1994 (−1.6%/year), the CO2 emissions have increased steadily (0.4%/year on average) until 2003 and decreased slowly again since (on average by 0.6%/year). Total CO2 emissions per capita decreased from 8.7 t in 1990 to 7.8 t in 2007, that is to say a decrease by 10%.
Almost 40% of the reduction in CO2 intensity is due to increased use of energy carriers with lower emission factors.
Total CO2 emissions per unit of GDP, the “CO2 intensity”, decreased more rapidly than energy intensity: by 2.3%/year and 1.4%/year, respectively, on average between 1990 and 2007.

However, while the reports from 2007 suggest that the CO2 emissions are going down recent studies find that the global emissions are rapidly escalating. According to the Climate Change 2022 Mitigation of Climate Change report, conducted by the IPCC, it states that it 2019 the world emissions output was 59 gigatonnes. This shows that global emissions has grown rapidly, increasing by about 2.1% each year compared from the previous decade.

The Commodity Exchange Bratislava (CEB) has calculated carbon intensity for Voluntary Emissions Reduction projects carbon intensity in 2012 to be 0.343 tn/MWh.

According to data from the European Commission, in order to achieve the EU goal of decreasing greenhouse gas emissions by at least 55% by 2030 compared to 1990, EU-based energy investment has to double from the previous decade to more than €400 billion annually this decade. This includes the roughly €300 billion in yearly investment required for energy efficiency and the roughly €120 billion required for power networks and renewable energy facilities.

Emission factors for greenhouse gas inventory reporting 

One of the most important uses of emission factors is for the reporting of national greenhouse gas inventories under the United Nations Framework Convention on Climate Change (UNFCCC). The so-called Annex I Parties to the UNFCCC have to annually report their national total emissions of greenhouse gases in a formalized reporting format, defining the source categories and fuels that must be included.

The UNFCCC has accepted the Revised 1996 IPCC Guidelines for National Greenhouse Gas Inventories, developed and published by the Intergovernmental Panel on Climate Change (IPCC) as the emission estimation methods that must be used by the parties to the convention to ensure transparency, completeness, consistency, comparability and accuracy of the national greenhouse gas inventories. These IPCC Guidelines are the primary source for default emission factors. Recently IPCC has published the 2006 IPCC Guidelines for National Greenhouse Gas Inventories. These and many more greenhouse gas emission factors can be found on IPCC's Emission Factor Database. Commercially applicable organisational greenhouse gas emission factors can be found on the search engine, EmissionFactors.com.

Particularly for non-CO2 emissions, there is often a high degree of uncertainty associated with these emission factors when applied to individual countries. In general, the use of country-specific emission factors would provide more accurate estimates of emissions than the use of the default emission factors. According to the IPCC, if an activity is a major source of emissions for a country ('key source'), it is 'good practice' to develop a country-specific emission factor for that activity.

Emission factors for air pollutant inventory reporting 
The United Nations Economic Commission for Europe and the EU National Emission Ceilings Directive (2016) require countries to produce annual National Air Pollution Emission Inventories under the provisions of the Convention on Long-Range Transboundary Air Pollution (CLRTAP).

The European Monitoring and Evaluation Programme (EMEP) Task Force of the European Environment Agency has developed methods to estimate emissions and the associated emission factors for air pollutants, which have been published in the EMEP/CORINAIR Emission Inventory Guidebook on Emission Inventories and Projections TFEIP.

Intensity targets 
Coal, being mostly carbon, emits a lot of  when burnt: it has a high  emission intensity. Natural gas, being methane, has 4 hydrogen atoms to burn for each one of carbon and thus has medium  emission intensity.

Sources of emission factors

Greenhouse gases 
2006 IPCC Guidelines for National Greenhouse Gas Inventories 
Revised 1996 IPCC Guidelines for National Greenhouse Gas Inventories (reference manual).
IPCC Emission Factor Database
National Inventory Report: Greenhouse Gas Sources and Sinks in Canada.
 United Kingdom's emission factor database.

Air pollutants 
AP 42, Compilation of Air Pollutant Emission Factors US Environmental Protection Agency
EMEP/CORIMAIR 2007 Emission Inventory Guidebook.
Fugitive emissions leaks from ethylene and other chemical plants.

Well-to-refinery carbon intensity (CI) of all major active oil fields globally

In an August 31, 2018 article by Masnadi et al. which was published by Science, the authors used "open-source oil-sector CI modeling tools" to "model well-to-refinery carbon intensity (CI) of all major active oil fields globally—and to identify major drivers of these emissions." They compared 90 countries with the highest crude oil footprint. The Science study, which was conducted by Stanford University found that Canadian crude oil is the "fourth-most greenhouse gas (GHG) intensive in the world" behind Algeria, Venezuela and Cameroon.

See also 

 Air pollution
 AP 42 Compilation of Air Pollutant Emission Factors
 Carbon footprint
 Emission inventory
 Energy intensity
 Greenhouse gas and Greenhouse effect
 IPCC list of greenhouse gases
 Kaya identity
 Low-carbon economy
 Low-carbon fuel standard
 Mobile emission reduction credit
 Radiative forcing
 Resource intensity
 Vehicle emission standard

References

External links
 Washington Post article with an example of change in carbon intensity
 A Note On Variations in UK Grid Electricity CO2 Intensity with Time
 IPCC Special Report on Emissions Scenarios
 Statistical Energy Review 2012
 World Energy Council:Odyssee Database
 International Energy Agency: CO2 emissions from fuel combustion 
 Electricity carbon intensity in European Member States: Impacts on GHG emissions of electric vehicles
 A hybrid LCA-WTW method to assess the carbon footprint of electric vehicles 
 Carbon emissions intensity from different regions

Air pollution emissions
Atmospheric dispersion modeling
Industrial emissions control
Environmental engineering
Energy economics